Robert Bray Mitinger (February 13, 1940 in Greensburg, Pennsylvania – September 25, 2004 in State College, Pennsylvania) was a professional football player, attorney and civic leader.

Professional career

He was named the 1962 Chargers' team Rookie of the Year.

He played 42 games at linebacker for the Chargers for seven seasons (1962–1964, 1966, 1968), including their 51–10 rout of the Boston Patriots at Balboa Stadium in the 1963 AFL championship, the high point of the team's 44-year history.

Mitinger's pro career was interrupted by a stint in the United States Army from 1966 to 1967. Stationed at West Point, New York, he coached the Army freshman football team. In 1968, he returned to the Chargers for his final season.

College
At Penn State, Mitinger was a two-way All-American player—the consummate 60-minute man, playing tight end and defensive end for Nittany Lions head coach, Rip Engle. He was part of the Penn State team that upset No. 10-ranked Alabama in the 1959 Liberty Bowl—the school's first bowl victory.

He also helped Penn State to victories over Oregon in the 1960 Liberty Bowl and No. 13-ranked Georgia Tech (30–15) in the 1961 Gator Bowl and was selected to compete in the 1962 Hula Bowl.

After Penn State defeated Cal 30–15 in 1962, Cal coach Marv Levy called Mitinger "the best college football player in the United States".

Mitinger was a member of the Sigma Alpha Epsilon fraternity at Penn State, class of 1962.

High school
Mitinger attended Greensburg-Salem High School in Greensburg, Pennsylvania.

After football
In 1966, Mitinger earned a law degree at the University of San Diego, which he attended in the AFL off-season, and for the 1968 and 1969 seasons worked with the players' union (the AFL Players Association) as their attorney. In 1970, he returned to State College, Pennsylvania where he practiced law for 30 years, starting his own law firm in 1984. He was also an instructor of business and real estate law at Penn State University from 1971 to 1994.

Personal
Mitinger lost his AFL championship ring while attending law school. In 1999, a Chula Vista, California man discovered the ring in his deceased mother's jewelry box and placed an ad on eBay, seeking to contact Mitinger. His mother had been a member of the law school's maintenance staff and had found the ring in the drain of the school's swimming pool. The appearance of the ring on the auction site led to the eventual return of the ring. "It renews my faith in humanity", Mitinger told The San Diego Union-Tribune.

He died September 27, 2004, at the Mount Nittany Medical Center in State College, Pennsylvania from complications from stomach cancer. He was 64.

The Robert B. Mitinger Award, named in his honor, is presented to Penn State Nittany Lions football players who personify courage, character and social responsibility. It was first awarded in 2004.

See also
List of American Football League players

External links
Comprehensive Bob Mitinger obituary, gopsusoprts.com
Bob Mitinger obituary, San Diego Union-Tribune, September 30, 2004
Robert Mitinger bio at Mitinger & De Boef (law firm), 

1940 births
2004 deaths
Deaths from stomach cancer
American football defensive ends
American football tight ends
American football linebackers
Players of American football from Pennsylvania
Army Black Knights football coaches
Penn State Nittany Lions football players
Pennsylvania State University faculty
People from Greensburg, Pennsylvania
San Diego Chargers players
United States Army soldiers
Pennsylvania lawyers
Deaths from cancer in Pennsylvania
American Football League players
20th-century American lawyers